Lord of the Flies is a 1954 novel by William Golding.

Lord of the Flies may also refer to:
Beelzebub, a satanic being
Lord of the Flies (1963 film), 1963 British drama film based on the novel
Lord of the Flies (1990 film), 1990 American thriller film based on the novel
"Lord of the Flies" (song), 1995 song by Iron Maiden
Lord of the Flies (album), fourth full-length studio album by English Gothic rock band Nosferatu
"Lord of the Flies" (The X-Files), fifth episode of the ninth season of the television series, The X-Files
A fictional substance with strange properties from His Master's Voice (novel), synthesized from an alien message

See also
"Lord of the Flys" (Lois & Clark: The New Adventures of Superman), an episode of the television series Lois & Clark: The New Adventures of Superman
Lord of the Fries (disambiguation)
"Lord of the Pi's", eighth episode of the third season of Veronica Mars
Beelzebub (disambiguation)